Frank Freeman (1861 – 13 October 1949) was a Canadian-American architect based in Brooklyn, New York. A leading exponent of the Richardsonian Romanesque architectural style who later adopted Neoclassicism, Freeman has been called "Brooklyn's greatest architect". Many details of his life and work are however still unknown, and Freeman himself has received little recognition outside academia. Many of his works have been demolished or otherwise destroyed, but most of those that remain have received New York City landmark status, either independently or as part of larger historic districts.

Life and career

Freeman was born in Hamilton, Ontario, Canada, in 1861. In the early 1880s, he arrived in New York, where he obtained a minor position in an architect's office while studying architecture. By 1885 he was a qualified architect, and in 1887 he established his own practice. Almost immediately he began attracting major commissions, one of the first being for the Hotel Margaret in 1888.

Freeman maintained offices in both Brooklyn and New York City, the latter in the Sun Building at 280 Broadway. While he designed buildings for clients in both Manhattan and Long Island and occasionally further afield, the great majority of his works were constructed in Brooklyn.

Freeman's early work was completed in the Richardsonian Romanesque style, at which he is considered a master. After the Chicago World's Fair in 1893 however, Romanesque went out of fashion and Freeman quickly adapted to the new Neoclassical trend, completing a major commission in the genre, the Brooklyn Savings Bank, even before the World's Fair had ended. Freeman also sometimes incorporated elements of other styles into his works, such as Italian Renaissance, Beaux Arts and Colonial Revival, in an eclectic manner.

Freeman once headed the Clubhouse Committee of the Crescent Athletic Club (whose headquarters he designed in 1906), and he was a parishioner of Holy Trinity Episcopal Church in Brooklyn Heights. He died in 1949 in a convalescent home in Montclair, New Jersey at the age of 88, after a long illness. He was survived by two daughters, Miss Katharine C. Freeman and Mrs Dorothea F. Sellew.

Freeman's family discarded his papers and records just days before architectural historian Alan Burnham arrived to request them. Historians have thus been obliged to try to piece together details of his career from municipal records, a task that was still ongoing as late as 1995.

Critical appraisal

Freeman's work has received high praise from architecture critics, most notably from Norval White who called him "Brooklyn's greatest architect"—an accolade frequently repeated, and that other critics have judged as not unreasonable. His work in the Richardsonian Romanesque style in particular has been singled out for attention. The 19th century critic Montgomery Schuyler credited him with "the most artistic examples of the Richardsonian Romanesque in our domestic architecture", while a 1979 report by the New York City Landmarks Preservation Commission described his works in this style to be "among the finest built anywhere in New York City." He has been praised for his "fecund imagination" and "infinite versatility"—an example of the latter being his Brooklyn Savings Bank, a neoclassical design, considered by critic Francis Morrone to have been perhaps Freeman's finest work.

More generally, Freeman's "marvellously clear and direct" buildings "seem to speak to people, he gave them a sense of immediacy", according to historian Andrew Dolkart. Dolkart asserts that had Freeman practiced in Manhattan, "he'd be famous; but just because he worked in Brooklyn, no one's ever heard of him." Though known to have been a prolific architect, many of Freeman's buildings have been demolished or destroyed, which further contributed to his lack of recognition. Many of Freeman's surviving works are now protected by landmark status.

List of works

The following tables list buildings known to have been designed by Frank Freeman. The first table is a list of extant works; the second a list of works that have been demolished or otherwise largely or wholly destroyed. Both lists are incomplete.

Buildings that still exist

Legend: Name=name of building; Address=address of building; Built=year building was completed (or remodelled, denoted by an "R" after the year); Style=architectural style. Styles include: RR=Richardsonian Romanesque; N=Neoclassical; E=eclectic; CR=Colonial Revival.

Buildings that no longer exist

Legend: Name=name of building; Address=address of building; Built=year building was completed (or remodelled, denoted by an "R" after the year); Style=architectural style. Styles include: RR=Richardsonian Romanesque; N=Neoclassical; E=eclectic; CR=Colonial Revival.

References

Bibliography
 American Institute of Architects (1992): AIA Architectural Guide to Nassau and Suffolk Counties, Long Island, Dover Publications, .
 Howard, Henry W. B.; Jervis, Arthur N. (1893): The Eagle and Brooklyn: The Record of the Progress of the Brooklyn Daily Eagle, Volume 2, The Brooklyn Daily Eagle.
 Lancaster, Clay; Gillon, Edmund V. Jr. (1980): Old Brooklyn Heights: New York's First Suburb, 5th Edition, Dover Publications, .
 Morrone, Francis; Iska, James (2001): An Architectural Guidebook to Brooklyn, Gibbs Smith, .

External links
 Adriana R. Kleiman research papers on Frank Freeman, circa 1900-1985 (bulk 1975-1985). Held by the Department of Drawings & Archives, Avery Architectural & Fine Arts Library, Columbia University.

1861 births
1949 deaths
19th-century American architects
20th-century American architects
19th-century Canadian architects
20th-century Canadian architects